David L. Diles (October 14, 1931 – December 29, 2009) was an American sports broadcaster and journalist, as well as an author.  He was a broadcaster for ABC Sports and hosted the “Prudential College Football Scoreboard Show”.

Early life
Dave Diles was born October 14, 1931, in Middleport, Ohio. At the age of 13 he started delivering the local newspaper, The Daily Sentinel, in Pomeroy, Ohio.

Diles moved to Athens, Ohio, and attended Ohio University.  He then worked for a local newspaper, the Athens Messenger, and later the Associated Press in Columbus and Detroit until 1961.

Career
In 1961, he became sports director of ABC's Detroit station WXYZ-TV until 1972 and then again from 1979 to 1982.

He hosted many other sports broadcasting programs, including College Football Scoreboard, Wide World of Sports, the Indianapolis 500, Olympic Games, NASCAR auto racing, professional golf, bowling, track and field, and college football play by play. He is also known for hosting “Race for No. 1” and “The Big Ten Today”.

During the 1960s, '70s, and '80s, Diles was the host of a local Detroit sports radio broadcasting show called “Dial Dave Diles”.  This was the city’s first radio sports talk show.

Diles is known for his work for commentating play by play for the LA Clippers, Detroit Lions, and Pistons and the Ohio State basketball team.  He also covered the Olympics.

He also wrote eight books about network television sports and the experiences of coaches and players in the professional and college sport business. This included co-authoring 1979's Terry Bradshaw, Man of Steel, a Christian-themed autobiography of the Pittsburgh Steeler quarterback.

Diles was also the president of both the Football Writers of America, Michigan Chapter, and the Detroit Sports Broadcasters Association.

Outside of sports, Diles was a substitute host for Lou Gordon on occasion.

Awards and honors
Diles was awarded many honors in the sports world. Some include:

Three times named the Associated Press Sportscaster of the Year
Received four Associated Press Documentary Awards
National Sports Service Award from Sport Magazine
National Football Foundation and Hall of Fame
National Association of Intercollegiate Athletics
Inducted into the Michigan Media Hall of Fame
Inducted into the Michigan Sports Hall of Fame in 2006
Received the Silver Circle Award from the National Academy of Television Arts and Sciences

Later life
Diles received the Distinguished Alumni Award from Ohio University. He established a scholarship at the University for students from his hometown in Meigs County.  He was also a trustee for another local college, The University of Rio Grande.

Dave Diles died on December 29, 2009, after a long battle with cancer which caused him to have a stroke. He was 78 years old.

Diles’ hometown named a park after him. The Dave Diles Park is named in his honor located in his hometown of Middleport Ohio, along the banks of the Ohio River. Meigs County is unrecognized by the sponsors at Ohio History Central to some degree. In published accounts of Israel Putnam of the Ohio Company and Revolutionary War officer, his land holdings (Rutledge and Bedford Townships), in Ohio are ignored. Not as famous as his family member Rufus Putnam certainly, but worth a footnote at least in the post Revolutionary War period through the Civil War.

References 

1931 births
2009 deaths
American sports journalists
People from Middleport, Ohio
Ohio University alumni
National Basketball Association broadcasters
College football announcers
College basketball announcers in the United States
Olympic Games broadcasters
Golf writers and broadcasters
Los Angeles Clippers announcers
Detroit Pistons announcers
National Football League announcers
Detroit Lions announcers
Bowling broadcasters
Motorsport announcers
Track and field broadcasters
Deaths from cancer in Ohio
Major League Baseball broadcasters